The Jubilee Hills Check Post Metro Station is located on the Blue Line of the Hyderabad Metro. It was the 50th metro station to be operationalised.

History 
It was opened on 18 May 2019.

Facilities 
It is a single-deck metro station with no concourse due to a peculiar land profile, which means passengers entering the station directly go to the platform deck. This metro station serves commuters from and to Film Nagar, Journalists Colony, Nandagiri Hills, Taraka Rama Nagar, Deen Dayal Nagar, Gayatri Hills and other colonies around Jubilee Hills Check Post and KBR Park and other areas of Banjara Hills. Jubilee Hills Check Post is the highest metro station in Hyderabad.

References

Hyderabad Metro stations
2019 establishments in Telangana